Old Colony Railroad Station is an historic Italianate train station located off Dean Street (US Route 44) in Taunton, Massachusetts. The historic station, also known as Dean Street, is proposed to be joined by the modern Taunton station around 2030 as part of Phase 2 of the South Coast Rail project.

History
The first Taunton station was constructed in 1866 when the Dighton and Somerset Railroad (owned by the Old Colony & Newport Railway) was opened. Originally to be called Taunton, it was renamed as Dean Street in 1865 (before the station even opened) because of the completion of Taunton Central station across town.

The 1876 building, a distinctive brick Italianate structure, is the only surviving railroad station in the city.  It has a main hip roof with modillioned eave and corbelled cornice, and a steeply pitched central gable section.  At the track level a second roof is supported by large wooden brackets.  The building's corners are articulated by stone quoining.  The building was added to the National Register of Historic Places as Old Colony Railroad Station in 1984.

Around 1882, the Old Colony began consolidating service at Taunton Central, beginning with through services. By 1895, only the Boat Train still served Dean Street. All service to the station ended around 1897 (though the station appeared on local maps for some time afterwards), and the line was abandoned from Dean Street to Raynham in 1932.

A new MBTA Commuter Rail station, Taunton, is proposed to be built at the site by 2030 as part of the second phase of the South Coast Rail project. An 800-foot-long high-level platform would be constructed just north of the historic building to serve a single passenger track; a freight passing track would also be added. The passing track was not present in original designs, but was added because the original one-track design would have prevented some wide freight trains from using the line.

See also
National Register of Historic Places listings in Taunton, Massachusetts
List of Old Colony Railroad stations

References

External links

National Register of Historic Places in Taunton, Massachusetts
Railway stations on the National Register of Historic Places in Massachusetts
Buildings and structures in Taunton, Massachusetts
Stations along Old Colony Railroad lines
Railway stations in the United States opened in 1876
MBTA Commuter Rail stations in Bristol County, Massachusetts
Former railway stations in Massachusetts
Railway stations closed in 1897
Railway stations scheduled to open in 2030
Proposed MBTA Commuter Rail stations